Hawise of Rennes ( 1024-1037 – 19 August 1072) was sovereign Duchess of Brittany from 1066 until her death.

She was the second child and heiress of Alan III, Duke of Brittany, by his wife, Bertha of Blois, and as such, a member of the House of Rennes. Hawise succeeded her older brother, Conan II, who was assassinated by poisoning on 11 December 1066.

Little is known of the life of Hawise of Rennes. She was married to Hoel of Cornwall some time before 1058. Hoel exercised authority jure uxoris and continued to control the government after her death in 1072 acting as regent for their son, Alan IV. A second son, Matthew, inherited the county of Nantes.

Family 
The daughter of Alan III and Bertha de Blois, Hawise had 2 siblings Conan II and Emma of Brittany. Hawise married Hoel of Cornwall and had 3 children

-Orwen de Cornouailles, (1050-1103)

-Hildeberge de Cornouaille, (1067-1095)

-Alain IV Fergant de Cornouaille, (circa 1067- October 19, 1119) Duke of Brittany, Count of Rennes, Count of Nantes

Notes

References
 Jean-Christophe Cassard, Houel Huuel : comte de Cornouaille puis duc de Bretagne (c. 1030–1084), t. CXVII, Société archéologique du Finistère, Quimper, 1988 (ISSN 0249-6763), pp. 95–117

1030s births
1072 deaths
11th-century dukes of Brittany
11th-century Breton women
11th-century women rulers
Duchesses of Brittany
Place of birth unknown
Place of death unknown
Dukes of Brittany